Susart (also Romanized as Sūsārt; also known as Sāsūrt, Sūsārd, and Sūsāt) is a village in Qahab-e Jonubi Rural District, in the Central District of Isfahan County, Isfahan Province, Iran. At the 2006 census, its population was 285, in 74 families.

References 

Populated places in Isfahan County